Konrad Ernst Otto Zuse (22 June 1910 – 18 December 1995) was a German civil engineer, pioneering computer scientist, inventor and businessman. His greatest achievement was the world's first programmable computer; the functional program-controlled Turing-complete Z3 became operational in May 1941. Thanks to this machine and its predecessors, Zuse has often been regarded as the inventor and father of the modern computer.

Zuse was noted for the S2 computing machine, considered the first process control computer. In 1941, he founded one of the earliest computer businesses, producing the Z4, which became the world's first commercial computer. From 1943 to 1945 he designed Plankalkül, the first high-level programming language. In 1969, Zuse suggested the concept of a computation-based universe in his book  (Calculating Space).

Much of his early work was financed by his family and commerce, but after 1939 he was given resources by the government of Nazi Germany. Due to World War II, Zuse's work went largely unnoticed in the United Kingdom and the United States. Possibly his first documented influence on a US company was IBM's option on his patents in 1946.

Early life and education
Konrad Zuse was born in Berlin on 22 June 1910. In 1912, his family moved to East Prussian Braunsberg (now Braniewo in Poland), where his father was a postal clerk. Zuse attended the Collegium Hosianum in Braunsberg, and in 1923, the family moved to Hoyerswerda, where he passed his Abitur in 1928, qualifying him to enter university.

He enrolled in the Technical University of Berlin and explored both engineering and architecture, but found them boring. Zuse then pursued civil engineering, graduating in 1935.

Career 
After graduation, Zuse worked for the Ford Motor Company, using his artistic skills in the design of advertisements. He started work as a design engineer at the Henschel aircraft factory in Schönefeld near Berlin. This required the performance of many routine calculations by hand, leading him to theorize and plan a way of doing them by machine.

Beginning in 1935, he experimented in the construction of computers in his parents' flat on  38, moving with them into their new flat on  10, the street leading up the Kreuzberg, Berlin. Working in his parents' apartment in 1936, he produced his first attempt, the Z1, a floating-point binary mechanical calculator with limited programmability, reading instructions from a perforated 35 mm film. 

In 1937, Zuse submitted two patents that anticipated a von Neumann architecture. In 1938, he finished the Z1 which contained some 30,000 metal parts and never worked well due to insufficient mechanical precision. On 30 January 1944, the Z1 and its original blueprints were destroyed with his parents' flat and many neighbouring buildings by a British air raid in World War II.

Zuse completed his work entirely independently of other leading computer scientists and mathematicians of his day. Between 1936 and 1945, he was in near-total intellectual isolation.

1939–1945
 
In 1939, Zuse was called to military service, where he was given the resources to ultimately build the Z2. The Z2 was a revised version of the Z1 using telephone relays.

Zuse built the S1 and S2 computing machines, which were special purpose devices which computed aerodynamic corrections to the wings of radio-controlled flying bombs. The S2 featured an integrated analog-to-digital converter under program control, making it the first process-controlled computer.

In 1941 Zuse started a company,  (Zuse Apparatus Construction), to manufacture his machines, renting a workshop on the opposite side in  7 and stretching through the block to   29 (renamed and renumbered as Mehringdamm 84 in 1947).

In 1941, he improved on the basic Z2 machine, and built the Z3. On 12 May 1941 Zuse presented the Z3, built in his workshop, to the public. The Z3 was a binary 22-bit floating-point calculator featuring programmability with loops but without conditional jumps, with memory and a calculation unit based on telephone relays. The telephone relays used in his machines were largely collected from discarded stock. Despite the absence of conditional jumps, the Z3 was a Turing complete computer. However, Turing-completeness was never considered by Zuse (who was unaware of Turing's work and had practical applications in mind) and only demonstrated in 1998 (see History of computing hardware).

The Z3, the first fully operational electromechanical computer, was partially financed by German government-supported DVL, which wanted their extensive calculations automated. A request by his co-worker Helmut Schreyer—who had helped Zuse build the Z3 prototype in 1938—for government funding for an electronic successor to the Z3 was denied as "strategically unimportant".

In 1937, Schreyer had advised Zuse to use vacuum tubes as switching elements; Zuse at this time considered it a crazy idea ( in his own words).

This event effectively brought Zuse's research and development to a complete halt. The partially finished, telephone relay-based Z4 computer was then packed and moved from Berlin on 14 February, arriving in Göttingen approximately two weeks later.

These machines contributed to the Henschel Werke Hs 293 and Hs 294 guided missiles developed by the German military between 1941 and 1945, which were the precursors to the modern cruise missile. The circuit design of the S1 was the predecessor of Zuse's Z11. Zuse believed that these machines had been captured by occupying Soviet troops in 1945.

While working on his Z4 computer, Zuse realised that programming in machine code was too complicated. He started working on a PhD thesis, containing groundbreaking research years ahead of its time, mainly the first high-level programming language,  ("Plan Calculus") and, as an elaborate example program, the first real computer chess engine.

1945–1995
After the 1945 Luisenstadt bombing, he fled from Berlin to the rural Allgäu. In the extreme deprivation of post-war Germany Zuse was unable to build computers.

Capital was raised in 1946 through ETH Zurich and an IBM option on Zuse's patents.

In 1947, according to the memoirs of the German computer pioneer Heinz Billing from the Max Planck Institute for Physics, there was a meeting between Alan Turing and Konrad Zuse in Göttingen. The encounter had the form of a colloquium. Participants were Womersley, Turing, Porter from England and a few German researchers like Zuse, Walther, and Billing. (For more details see Herbert Bruderer).
 
It was not until 1949 that Zuse was able to resume work on the Z4. He would show the computer to the mathematician Eduard Stiefel of the Swiss Federal Institute of Technology Zurich who then ordered one in 1950. In November 1949, Zuse KG was founded and that Z4 was delivered to ETH Zurich in July 1950, and proved very reliable.

In 1949, Zuse founded another company, Zuse KG, in Haunetal-Neukirchen; in 1957 the company's head office moved to Bad Hersfeld. The Z4 was finished and delivered to the ETH Zurich, Switzerland in September 1950. At that time, it was the only working computer in continental Europe, and the second computer in the world to be sold, beaten only by the BINAC, which never worked properly after it was delivered. Other computers, all numbered with a leading Z, up to Z43, were built by Zuse and his company. Notable are the Z11, which was sold to the optics industry and to universities, and the Z22, the first computer with a memory based on magnetic storage.

The PhD thesis was submitted at University of Augsburg, but rejected for formal reasons, because Zuse forgot to pay the 400 mark university enrollment fee. The rejection did not bother him. 

 slightly influenced the design of ALGOL 58 but was itself implemented only in 1975 in a dissertation by Joachim Hohmann. Heinz Rutishauser, one of the inventors of ALGOL, wrote: "The very first attempt to devise an algorithmic language was undertaken in 1948 by K. Zuse. His notation was quite general, but the proposal never attained the consideration it deserved." Further implementations followed in 1998 and then in 2000 by a team from the Free University of Berlin. Donald Knuth suggested a thought experiment: What might have happened had the bombing not taken place, and had the PhD thesis accordingly been published as planned?

In 1956, Zuse began to work on a high precision, large format plotter. It was demonstrated at the 1961 Hanover Fair, and became well known also outside of the technical world thanks to Frieder Nake's pioneering computer art work. Other plotters designed by Zuse include the ZUSE Z90 and ZUSE Z9004.

In 1967, Zuse suggested that the universe itself is running on a cellular automaton or similar computational structure (digital physics); in 1969, he published the book  (translated into English as Calculating Space).

Between 1989 and 1995, Zuse conceptualized and created a purely mechanical, extensible, modular tower automaton he named "helix tower". The structure is based on a gear drive that employs rotary motion (e.g. provided by a crank) to assemble modular components from a storage space, elevating a tube-shaped tower; the process is reversible, and inverting the input direction will deconstruct the tower and store the components. In 2009, the  restored Zuse's original 1:30 functional model that can be extended to a height of 2.7 m. Zuse intended the full construction to reach a height of 120 m, and envisioned it for use with wind power generators and radio transmission installations.

Between 1987 and 1989, Zuse recreated the Z1, suffering a heart attack midway through the project. It cost 800,000 DM (approximately $500,000) and required four individuals (including Zuse) to assemble it. Funding for this retrocomputing project was provided by Siemens and a consortium of five companies.

Personal life

Konrad Zuse married Gisela Brandes in January 1945, employing a carriage, himself dressed in tailcoat and top hat and with Gisela in a wedding veil, for Zuse attached importance to a "noble ceremony". Their son Horst, the first of five children, was born in November 1945.

While Zuse never became a member of the Nazi Party, he is not known to have expressed any doubts or qualms about working for the Nazi war effort. Much later, he suggested that in modern times, the best scientists and engineers usually have to choose between either doing their work for more or less questionable business and military interests in a Faustian bargain, or not pursuing their line of work at all.

After Zuse retired, he focused on his hobby of painting. He signed his paintings as "Kuno [von und zu] See".

Zuse was an atheist.

Zuse died on 18 December 1995 in Hünfeld, Hesse (near Fulda) from heart failure.

Awards and honours
Zuse received several awards for his work:
 Werner von Siemens Ring in 1964 (together with Fritz Leonhardt and Walter Schottky)
 Harry H. Goode Memorial Award in 1965 (together with George Stibitz)
 Wilhelm Exner Medal in 1969.
 Bundesverdienstkreuz in 1972 – Great Cross of Merit
 Computer History Museum Fellow Award in 1999 "for his invention of the first program-controlled, electromechanical, digital computer and the first high-level programming language, Plankalkül."

The Zuse Institute Berlin is named in his honour.

The Konrad Zuse Medal of the Gesellschaft für Informatik, and the Konrad Zuse Medal of the Zentralverband des Deutschen Baugewerbes (Central Association of German Construction), are both named after Zuse.

A replica of the Z3, as well as the original Z4, is in the Deutsches Museum in Munich. The Deutsches Technikmuseum in Berlin has an exhibition devoted to Zuse, displaying twelve of his machines, including a replica of the Z1 and several of Zuse's paintings.

The 100th anniversary of his birth was celebrated by exhibitions, lectures and workshops.

See also

 Z5
 Z23
 Z25
 List of pioneers in computer science
 John Vincent Atanasoff
 German inventors and discoverers
 Reverse Polish notation (RPN)
 Self-replicating machine (Montagestraße SRS 72, Helixturm)

References

Further reading
 Zuse, Konrad. Direction-bound engraving tool with program control. U.S. Patent 3163936
 U.S. Patents 3234819; 3306128; 3408483; 3356852; 3316442
 Jürgen Alex, Hermann Flessner, Wilhelm Mons, Horst Zuse: Konrad Zuse: Der Vater des Computers. Parzeller, Fulda 2000, 
 Raul Rojas (ed.): Die Rechenmaschinen von Konrad Zuse. Springer, Berlin 1998, .
 Wilhelm Füßl (ed.): 100 Jahre Konrad Zuse. Einblicke in den Nachlass, München 2010, .
 Jürgen Alex: "Wege und Irrwege des Konrad Zuse." In: Spektrum der Wissenschaft (German edition of Scientific American) 1/1997, .
 Hadwig Dorsch: Der erste Computer. Konrad Zuses Z1 – Berlin 1936. Beginn und Entwicklung einer technischen Revolution. Mit Beiträgen von Konrad Zuse und Otto Lührs. Museum für Verkehr und Technik, Berlin 1989.
 Clemens Kieser: "'Ich bin zu faul zum Rechnen': Konrad Zuses Computer Z22 im Zentrum für Kunst und Medientechnologie Karlsruhe." In: Denkmalpflege in Baden-Württemberg, 4/34/2005, Esslingen am Neckar, S. 180–184, .
 Mario G. Losano (ed.), Zuse. L'elaboratore nasce in Europa. Un secolo di calcolo automatico, Etas Libri, Milano 1975, pp. XVIII–184.
 Arno Peters: Was ist und wie verwirklicht sich Computer-Sozialismus: Gespräche mit Konrad Zuse. Verlag Neues Leben, Berlin 2000, .
 Paul Janositz: Informatik und Konrad Zuse: "Der Pionier des Computerbaus in Europa – Das verkannte Genie aus Adlershof." In: Der Tagesspiegel Nr. 19127, Berlin, 9. März 2006, Beilage Seite B3.
 Jürgen Alex: Zum Einfluß elementarer Sätze der mathematischen Logik bei Alfred Tarski auf die drei Computerkonzepte des Konrad Zuse. TU Chemnitz 2006.
 
 Herbert Bruderer: Konrad Zuse und die Schweiz. Wer hat den Computer erfunden? Charles Babbage, Alan Turing und John von Neumann Oldenbourg Verlag, München 2012, XXVI, 224 Seiten,

External links

 Konrad Zuse Internet Archive
  – By Horst Zuse (Konrad Zuse's son); an extensive and well-written historical account
 
 Konrad Zuse and his computers, from Technische Universität Berlin
 Konrad Zuse
 Konrad Zuse, inventor of first working programmable computer
 Zuse's thesis of digital physics and the computable universe
 Deutsches Technikmuseum Berlin 
 Konrad Zuse Museum Hoyerswerda 
 Computermuseum Kiel Z11
 Computermuseum Kiel Z22
 Computermuseum Kiel 
 Video lecture by Zuse discussing the history of Z1 to 4
 Video showing the model of the helix tower in action

 
1910 births
1995 deaths
Businesspeople from Berlin
Cellular automatists
Computer designers
Computer hardware engineers
German atheists
20th-century atheists
German civil engineers
German computer scientists
20th-century German inventors
Grand Crosses with Star and Sash of the Order of Merit of the Federal Republic of Germany
Programming language designers
Technical University of Berlin alumni
Werner von Siemens Ring laureates
Engineers from Berlin